Torsby Municipality (Torsby kommun) is a municipality in Värmland County in west central Sweden, bordering Norway. Its seat is located in the town of Torsby.

The name Torsby means Thor's village.

The present municipality consists of eight original local government entities (as of 1863): Dalby, Fryksände, Lekvattnet, Norra Finnskoga, Norra Ny, Nyskoga, Södra Finnskoga, Vitsand and Östmark. In 1952 they were grouped into four larger units and in 1974 they were all united.

There is much Finnish heritage in Torsby Municipality.

Localities

Population centers in the municipality include:
 Ambjörby
 Oleby
 Östmark
 Stöllet
 Sysslebäck
 Torsby (seat)

Transportation
Torsby is the end station on the Fryksdal branchline from Karlstad via Kil. There is a small airport with scheduled flights to Stockholm, whilst the nearest international airport is Gardermoen in Norway. The  road, E45, passes through the municipality.

Sport
Sven-Göran Eriksson and Marcus Berg have their roots in Torsby.

The municipality has a number of skiing centres for both alpine skiing (Hovfjället and Branäs) and cross-country skiing (Mattila and Långberget). A cross-country ski tunnel, which is also the world's longest, opened on June 16, 2006.

Stjerneskolan, a senior high school, specializes in cross-country skiing and biathlon. The most famous former pupil is Gunde Svan. Carl Johan Bergman, who was born in Ekshärad, also studied there for a year.

Elections

Riksdag
These are the local results of the Riksdag elections since the 1972 municipality reform. The results of the Sweden Democrats were not published by SCB between 1988 and 1998 at a municipal level to the party's small nationwide size at the time. "Votes" denotes valid votes, whereas "Turnout" denotes also blank and invalid votes.

Blocs

This lists the relative strength of the socialist and centre-right blocs since 1973, but parties not elected to the Riksdag are inserted as "other", including the Sweden Democrats results from 1988 to 2006, but also the Christian Democrats pre-1991 and the Greens in 1982, 1985 and 1991. The sources are identical to the table above. The coalition or government mandate marked in bold formed the government after the election. New Democracy got elected in 1991 but are still listed as "other" due to the short lifespan of the party.

References

External links

Torsby Municipality - Official site
Branäs alpine skiing

Municipalities of Värmland County
fi:Torsby